This is a list of airports in the Turks and Caicos Islands, sorted by location.
The Turks and Caicos Islands are a British Overseas Territory located southeast of Mayaguana in the Bahamas and north of the island of Hispaniola. It consists of two groups of sub-tropical islands in the West Indies, the larger Caicos Islands and the smaller Turks Islands. The total population is about 36,000, of whom approximately 22,500 live on Providenciales in the Caicos Islands. Cockburn Town, the capital, is on Grand Turk Island.

Airports 
Names shown in bold indicate the airport has scheduled passenger service on commercial airlines.

See also 

 List of airports by ICAO code: M#MB - Turks and Caicos Islands
 List of airports in the United Kingdom and the British Crown Dependencies
 Wikipedia: WikiProject Aviation/Airline destination lists: North America#Turks and Caicos Islands (United Kingdom)

References 
 Turks and Caicos Islands Government: Civil Aviation
 Turks and Caicos Tourist Board: Travel Information
 
  - includes IATA codes
 Great Circle Mapper: Turks and Caicos Islands - IATA and ICAO codes

 
Airports
Turks and Caicos Islands
Turks and Caicos Islands